Ramesh Chennithala, (born 25 May 1956), is an Indian politician, and a senior leader of the Indian National Congress. He was the Leader of the Opposition in the 14th Kerala Legislative Assembly. He also served as the state Home Minister in the Government of Kerala for two years. He holds the record of the youngest minister in Kerala at the age of 28.

Chennithala has served as a Member of Parliament for four terms from Kottayam and Mavelikkara Parliament Constituencies  and as a member of the Legislative assembly (MLA) for five terms including the current term from Haripad assembly constituency. He is the only leader from South India to hold the position of President of both State Students Union (KSU) and National Students Union (NSUI). He is also the only Malayali to hold the position of Indian Youth Congress (IYC) President during the time of Rajiv Gandhi.  He has represented the highest body of the Indian National Congress, the Congress Working Committee (CWC) in 2004.

Personal life
Chennithala was born at Chennithala, Mavelikara in Kerala, India on 25 May 1956 to V. Ramakrishnan Nair and Devakiamma. He studied Bachelor of Arts (B.A.) degree in Economics and Bachelor of Laws (LL.B.). He is married to Anita. They have two sons, namely Rohit Chennithala and Ramit Chennithala. Rohit Chennithala is a physician by profession and Ramit Chennithala cleared the Civil Services Examination 2017 with 210th rank and currently works for the Indian Revenue Service.

Political career

Chennithala started his political life during his early school days. In 1970, he became the Kerala Students Union (KSU) Chennithala HS Unit Secretary. He subsequently held a series of positions in KSU, namely Mavelikkara Taluk General Secretary in 1971, KSU Alappuzha District Treasurer in 1972, Alappuzha District Secretary in 1973, KSU State Executive Member in 1975, KSU State Vice President in 1978, and eventually becoming the KSU State President in 1980.

In 1982, he became All India President of the National Students Union of India and later in the same year was elected as MLA from Haripad Constituency. In 1985, he became the General Secretary of Indian Youth Congress and went on to become the youngest Minister (Rural Development) in the Ministry of K. Karunakaran in 1986 at the age of 28. In 1986, he became the President of Kerala Pradesh Youth Congress (I), Kerala and in 1987 he was re-elected as MLA from Haripad Constituency.

In 1989 he was elected as Member of Parliament from Kottayam Parliamentary Constituency and became National President, Indian Youth Congress in 1990. In 1999, he became Member of Parliament from Mavelikkara Parliamentary Constituency. In 2004 loksabha elections he was defeated by CPI(M) leader Adv. C.S. Sujatha.

Later in 1991, 1996, and 1999 he was re-elected to Parliament. He received rich accolades for his fiery speeches in Hindi and English during his tenure. In 2001 he became the AICC Secretary with independent charge of seven states and in 2002 with independent charge of five states. In 2004, he was selected to the highest body of Indian National Congress, the Congress Working Committee (CWC).

He was also a member of various committees including Consultative Committee for Commerce; Labour and Welfare Committee; Central Committee for 125th Birth Anniversary of Mahatma Gandhi; Central Committee for Birth Centenary of Subhash Chandra Bose; Finance Committee – Lok Sabha; H.R.D. Standing Committee;  Public Accounts Committee; Coir Board; Civil aviation Consultative Committee; and Joint Parliamentary Committee on Pesticides in Soft Drinks and Fruit Drinks. Other important positions held include KPCC President, AICC Secretary, Indian Youth Congress National President, President of Pradesh Youth Congress (I) Kerala.

In 2005, he returned to state politics to become president of Kerala Pradesh Congress Committee. In 2011, for the third time, he was re-elected as MLA from Haripad Constituency. In 2014, he was sworn in as the Home Minister of Kerala. His "Operation Kubera" project was intended to stop the reign of illegal money lenders in the state. The "Clean campus safe campus" project was to stop the usage of drugs in campus.

He shared the dais with Kerala chief minister Pinarayi Vijayan at a joint anti-CAA protest organised by the ruling CPM-led LDF to express his views on the CAA. Leader of the opposition Chennithala said he has moved a petition challenging the Act which drew criticism from the then-KPCC President Mullappally Ramachandran. However, KPCC vice-president V. D. Satheesan, stated that the protest against CAA and the proposed National Register of Citizens (NRC) was "a fight for a common cause".

Ministries 
Chennithala holds the record of being the youngest minister in the state at the age of 28.
Minister of Rural Development in the Third K. Karunakaran ministry from 1986 to 1987.

He became a Member of Parliament for a long period, returned to state politics in 2005, and became the president of the state Congress Party.

Minister of Home Affairs in the Second Oommen Chandy ministry from 2014 to 2016.

After the 2016 Kerala election, he became the Leader of the Opposition of the state.

Leader of Opposition 
A meeting held by the Congress leaders on 29 May 2016 chose Chennithala as the Leader of Opposition of Kerala Niyamasabha. Under his leadership the UDF emerged victorious in 2019 Indian general election by winning 19 out of 20 seats in Kerala. This was their biggest victory in the elections after the 1977 election. It was under his leadership UDF faced such a defeat in 2021 Kerala Legislative Assembly election and LDF retained power by breaking the four-decade alternative rule trend between Left Democratic Front (Kerala) and United Democratic Front (Kerala).

Actions taken 

 Chennithala approached the Anti-Corruption Court against Chief Minister Pinarayi Vijayan and Excise Minister T. P. Ramakrishnan for revising the liquor policy in the state. However, the Supreme Court exempted gram panchayat areas having an urban nature from liquor prohibition, leading to the reopening of all shut outlets. Following this, Chennithala argued that the government was misinterpreting the SC verdict.

Awards 

 He received the P. V. Sankaranarayanan Memorial Award in 2014.

Controversy 

 January 8, 2019: While addressing media in Thiruvananthapuram, Chennithala stated that his decision to appoint T. P. Senkumar as DGP was "the biggest mistake of my life and I regret the decision,". Chennithala added that Senkumar was made DGP overruling another officer and the decision proved wrong. "We all are bearing the burden of this decision. I took the decision thinking to let a Malayali become the DGP. But now, I regret it," he added. He had earlier criticised the chief minister Pinarayi Vijayan for removing Senkumar from the post on numerous occasions.
 September 8, 2020: Chennithala's remarks generated controversy when a journalist indicated about the Congress leaned NGO union links of the health inspector who molested a woman who sought COVID-19 negative certificate. Later, he said that his statements were taken out of context but apologized.

References

Further reading

External links

 Kerala Pradesh Congress Committee
 News Report

1956 births
Living people
Malayali politicians
Indian National Congress politicians from Kerala
India MPs 1989–1991
India MPs 1991–1996
India MPs 1996–1997
India MPs 1999–2004
Lok Sabha members from Kerala
Kerala MLAs 1982–1987
Kerala MLAs 2016–2021
Kerala MLAs 2011–2016
Leaders of the Opposition in Kerala
Government Law College, Thiruvananthapuram alumni